The  Wapello County Courthouse in Ottumwa, Iowa, United States, was built in 1894. It was listed on the National Register of Historic Places in 1981 as a part of the County Courthouses in Iowa Thematic Resource. The courthouse is the fourth building the county has used for court functions and county administration. It is part of the Central Park area, which includes: Ottumwa Public Library, Ottumwa City Hall, and St. Mary of the Visitation Catholic Church.

History
Wapello County's first courthouse was a single-story log cabin. It was replaced in 1846 by a two-story square frame structure that measured . It was built for $1,000. The first floor was used as a schoolhouse, church, courthouse, dancehall, and a place for political meetings. The second floor was used for office space. The building was sold to the Christian Church (Disciples of Christ) in 1855 for their use. It was later sold to W.C. Grimes who used it to build wagons. The building was destroyed in a fire in 1872. It had been replaced by a brick structure that measured . It was also used for a variety of functions such as a theater, lecture hall, opera house, and a place of worship. The present courthouse was built for $135,000 and was dedicated in 1894. The significance of the courthouse is derived from its association with county government, and the political power and prestige of Ottumwa as the county seat.

Architecture

The present courthouse was constructed of rough-cut sandstone in the Richardsonian Romanesque style. It was designed by the Des Moines architectural firm of Foster & Liebbe, and C. Stanfford was the contractor who built it. The four-story building measures  and a statue of Chief Wapello rests on a pedestal high above the main entrance. Until 1950 the building featured a clock tower and spire on the corner tower. It was removed for safety reasons. The massive round arch entry is mimicked in the floor above by the triple window with the arched opening in the center. The cluster of columns that flank the entrance are made of granite and the columns that are in between the windows above the entrance are smooth limestone. A foliated pattern appears above the granite columns. The cornice, just below the roofline, features small square-cut stone blocks called dentils.

The interior has been renovated over the course of years, but it does feature an ornate cast-iron staircase behind the elevator shaft. The newel post is a short, squat column with a foliated capital. The ironwork on the balustrade is a combination of linear and curvilinear forms. Colorful glazed tile floors are found above the first floor of the building. Various colors and designs are used in different parts of the building.

The wainscoting on the first floor is made of yellow and blue glazed tiles that were popular in the 1890s. In the rest of the building is composed of decorative wood panels. It features fluted pilasters and square panels with flowers. The doorways are deeply recessed and feature a transom above a multi-paneled door. The framing is milled woodwork that creates the effect of a fluted pilaster, as well as decorative corner and side blocks. The corner blocks feature a fleur-de-lis pattern and the side blocks feature various floral patterns. A simple cornice tops each doorway. The woodwork continues in the courtroom. Behind the judge's bench is a decorative panel that contains a classical urn with a vine and leaf pattern and the Latin phrase Fiat Justitia (Let there be Justice). Another panel is on the front of the bench and contains a female figure in the middle surrounded by foliage and two banners that repeat the Latin phrase.

References

Government buildings completed in 1894
Richardsonian Romanesque architecture in Iowa
Buildings and structures in Ottumwa, Iowa
Courthouses on the National Register of Historic Places in Iowa
County courthouses in Iowa
National Register of Historic Places in Wapello County, Iowa